Answer This! is an American 2011 comedy film written and directed by Christopher Farah and starring Christopher Gorham, Arielle Kebbel, and Chris Parnell. The film was primarily filmed in Ann Arbor, Michigan and is set at the University of Michigan; it is the first film to have been filmed closely in cooperation with the University.

Cast

 Christopher Gorham as Paul Tarson
 Arielle Kebbel as Naomi
 Chris Parnell as Brian Collins
 Kip Pardue as Lucas Brannstrom
 Nelson Franklin as James Koogly
 Evan Jones as Izzy 'Ice' Dasselway
 Kali Hawk as Shelly
 Ralph Williams  as Dr. Elliot Tarson
 Michael Sinterniklaas as Umlatt the Flunkee

Production
The film features many notable locations around the city of Ann Arbor, as well as the University of Michigan. The locations include Ashley's, Zingerman's Delicatessen, the University of Michigan Law Quad, Saint Thomas School, Michigan Stadium, the Diag, the Michigan League, Nickels Arcade, the Ann Arbor Farmer's Market, Barton Pond and the Barton Hills area, Washtenaw Dairy, Espresso Royale, Eight Ball Saloon, and the Michigan Union.

References

External links
 
 
 
 Apple Trailers page for Answer This!
 Detroit News Review: Comic 'Answer This!' celebrates Ann Arbor

University of Michigan

2011 films
American comedy films
Films set in Michigan
Films scored by John Paesano
2011 comedy films
2010s English-language films
2010s American films